Gruss may refer to:

 6516 Gruss, a main-belt asteroid
 Olaf Gruss, a botanist
 Peter Gruss (born 1949), a German developmental biologist
 Shoshanna Lonstein Gruss (born 1975), an American fashion designer
 Robert Dwayne Gruss (born 1955), a bishop of the Catholic Church in the United States

See also 
 Grüss Gott, literally, "God greet you", a German greeting
 Hitlergruss, the Nazi salute
 Grus (disambiguation)